The 26th Annual Gotham Independent Film Awards, presented by the Independent Filmmaker Project, were held on November 28, 2016. The nominees were announced on October 20, 2016. Actors Ethan Hawke and Amy Adams, director Oliver Stone and producer Arnon Milchan received tribute awards. The ceremony was hosted by Keegan-Michael Key.

Winners and nominees

Film

Television

Special awards

Special Jury Award – Ensemble Performance
 Moonlight – Mahershala Ali, Naomie Harris, Alex Hibbert, André Holland, Jharrel Jerome, Janelle Monáe, Jaden Piner, Trevante Rhodes, and Ashton SandersSpotlight on Women Filmmakers "Live the Dream" Grant
 Roxy Toporowych – Julia Blue
 Shaz Bennett – Alaska is a Drag
 Katie Orr – Poor Jane

Made in NY Award
 Aziz Ansari
 Judith Light

Gotham Appreciation Award
 Mayor's Office of Media and Entertainment (MOME)

Gotham Tributes
 Amy Adams
 Ethan Hawke
 Arnon Milchan
 Oliver Stone

References

External links
 

2016 film awards
2016